Mohammad Pour Rahmatollah is an Iranian football midfielder who plays for Malavan in the Azadegan League.

Club career

Malavan
He started his career with Esteghlal Anzali U12. Later he joined the Malavan Academy and spent 7 seasons with Malavan youth levels. He was called to the first team by Dragan Skočić and made his debut in 2013–14 Iran Pro League against Gostaresh Foulad as a starter.

Tractor Sazi
Pour Rahmatollah joined Tractor Sazi in summer 2014 with a two-years contract while he was contracted with Malavan. However, Tractor Sazi announced that he and Shahin Saghebi joined the club to spend their conscription period.

Club career statistics

International career

U20
He was invited to Iran U–20 by Ali Dousti Mehr to preparation for 2014 AFC U-19 Championship.

References

External links
Mohammad Pour Rahmatollah at IranLeague.ir

Living people
Iranian footballers
Malavan players
Tractor S.C. players
1995 births
Iran under-20 international footballers
Association football midfielders
People from Bandar-e Anzali
Sportspeople from Gilan province